Allen Chapman (born July 23, 1991) is an American football cornerback for the Arizona Rattlers of the Indoor Football League (IFL). He was signed as an undrafted free agent by the Indianapolis Colts in 2013. He played college football at Kansas State.

High school career
Chapman attended Oak Grove High School in San Jose, California, where he played football and basketball. He earned All-BVAL first-team honors in 2007 and 2008, and was the 2008 Most Valuable DB. As a senior, he recorded 34 tackles, 3 interceptions, 4 passes defended and a forced fumble. He also rushed for 332 yards and 8 touchdowns.

College career

Community college
Chapman was not offered any scholarships after graduating from high school, so he decided to stay close to home and play for the City College of San Francisco Rams. In his two years with the Rams, he compiled 39 tackles, 15 interceptions, 2 fumble recoveries, 3 touchdowns and a sack. With the help of future Wildcats teammate Nigel Malone, he led his team to a 12-1 record in 2010, as well as the school's 11th NorCal Championship. They eventually lost in the state championship to Mt. San Antonio College.

Chapman was drawing interest from several NCAA Division I schools. He was now considered a three-star prospect by Rivals.com and received interest from a dozen D-I schools. He accepted a scholarship from Kansas State over other offers from New Mexico, New Mexico State, and Tulsa in order to play for head coach Bill Snyder.

Kansas State
As a junior in 2011, he registered 50 tackles, 5 passes defended, a forced fumble and an interception. He returned that interception 60 yards for a touchdown on November 5 against #3 Oklahoma State, but they went on to lose 52-45. His playing time increased as a senior in 2012, and he recorded career highs in tackles (57), interceptions (6) and passes defended (10). On a November 3 game, also against Oklahoma State, he intercepted quarterback Clint Chelf three times, including one for a touchdown. He earned FBS Defensive Player of the Week and Big 12 Defensive Player of the Week honors for his performance.

Professional career

Indianapolis Colts
After going undrafted in the 2013 NFL draft, the Indianapolis Colts signed him as an undrafted free agent to a rookie contract on May 12, 2013. Coincidentally, the Colts released Nigel Malone (who played with Chapman at CC of San Francisco and Kansas State) in order to make space for the rookie cornerback. However, the Colts released Chapman on August 25 as part of the final roster cuts to trim the roster down to 78 players.

Arizona Rattlers
On November 1, 2013, Chapman (and two other rookies) were assigned to the Arizona Rattlers of the Arena Football League. He played his first game on April 26, 2014 against the San Antonio Talons, where his 4 combined tackles contributed to a 69-59 victory. His first career interception came a few weeks later, when he intercepted a pass by Danny Southwick with 50 seconds left and returned it 21 yards for a touchdown, which clinched a 70-59 victory against the Portland Thunder on a June 6 showdown.

New Orleans VooDoo
On March 23, 2015, Chapman was traded to the New Orleans VooDoo, along with Rayshaun Kizer, in exchange for future considerations.

Portland Thunder
On March 30, 2015, Chapman was traded to the Portland Thunder for claim order positioning. On July 8, 2015, Chapman was placed on reassignment.

Arizona Rattlers
On November 9, 2015, Chapman was assigned to the Arizona Rattlers. On January 19, 2017, Chapman signed with the Rattlers. Chapman was named First-team All-Indoor Football League in 2017. On July 8, the Rattlers defeated the Sioux Falls Storm in the United Bowl by a score of 50–41. He re-signed with the Rattlers on September 12, 2017.

Tampa Bay Storm
On July 31, 2017, Chapman was assigned to the Tampa Bay Storm. The Storm folded in December 2017.

References

External links
Kansas State Wildcats bio
Indianapolis Colts bio
Arizona Rattlers bio

1991 births
Living people
American football cornerbacks
Players of American football from San Francisco
African-American players of American football
City College of San Francisco Rams football players
Kansas State Wildcats football players
Indianapolis Colts players
Arizona Rattlers players
New Orleans VooDoo players
Portland Thunder players
Tampa Bay Storm players
21st-century African-American sportspeople